The prime minister of Croatia, officially the President of the Government of the Republic of Croatia, is Croatia's head of government, and is de facto the most powerful and influential state officeholder in the Croatian system of government. Following the first-time establishment of the office in 1945, the 1990–2000 semi-presidential period is the only exception where the president of Croatia held de facto executive authority. In the formal Croatian order of precedence, however, the position of prime minister is the third highest state office, after the president of the Republic and the speaker of the Parliament.

The Constitution of Croatia prescribes that "Parliament supervises the Government" (Article 81) and that "the President of the Republic ensures the regular and balanced functioning and stability of government" (as a whole; Article 94), while the Government is introduced in Article 108. Since 2000, the prime minister has had various added constitutional powers and is mentioned before the Government itself in the text of the Constitution, in Articles 87, 97, 99, 100, 101, 103, 104. The current prime minister of Croatia is Andrej Plenković. The Government of Croatia meets in Banski dvori, a historical building located on the west side of St. Mark's Square in Zagreb.

Name

The official name of the office, literally translated, is "President of the Government" (Predsjednik / Predsjednica Vlade), rather than a literal translation of "Prime Minister" (Prvi Ministar). In Croatian, the shorter term  (Premier) is commonly used as well.

History

Background

The Royal Government of the Kingdom of Croatia-Slavonia (1868–1918) was headed by the Ban of Croatia (Viceroy), who represented the King.

The first head of government of Croatia as a constituent republic of Federal People's Republic of Yugoslavia was Vladimir Bakarić, who assumed the position on 14 April 1945. The position was then the most powerful public office in the state in addition to the position of the Secretary of the League of Communists of Croatia, as a single-party system was in place. The head of government was renamed to the President of the Executive Council in 1952. Notably, Savka Dabčević-Kučar was the first woman (not only in Croatia, but in Europe) to hold an office equivalent to a head of government as Chairman of the Executive Council of the Socialist Republic of Croatia (1967–1969).

Transition to independence
After the constitutional amendments that allowed for multi-party elections in Croatia in 1990, the country was still a constituent republic of SFR Yugoslavia, the position of the President of the Executive Council of the Socialist Republic of Croatia was filled by Stjepan Mesić on 30 May 1990 (the 14th Executive Council).

The newly-elected Croatian Parliament enacted numerous amendments to the constitution on 25 July 1990. It eliminated socialist references and adopted new national symbols, while the Government of the Republic of Croatia was formally instituted by Amendment LXXIII.

The Constitution of Croatia was subsequently also changed significantly on 22 December 1990, as the so-called "Christmas Constitution" fundamentally defined the Republic of Croatia and its governmental structure. From this point onwards, Croatia was a semi-presidential republic, which meant the president of Croatia had broad executive powers (further expanded with laws to a point of superpresidentialism), including the appointment and dismissal of the prime minister and other officials in the government.

Following the May 1991 independence referendum in which 93% of voters approved secession, Croatia formally proclaimed independence from Yugoslavia on 25 June 1991, with Josip Manolić continuing in the role of prime minister as head of government of an independent Croatia. However, the country then signed the July 1991 Brijuni Agreement in which it agreed to postpone further activities towards severing ties with Yugoslavia. Meanwhile, the Croatian War of Independence ensued, and Franjo Gregurić was appointed to lead a Government of National Unity. In October the same year, Croatia formally severed all remaining legal ties with the Yugoslav Federation.

Since independence
During the period between 1990 and the next constitutional amendments in late 2000, Croatia had seven prime ministers.

Following the January 2000 general election the winning centre-left coalition led by the Social Democratic Party amended the Constitution and effectively stripped the President of most of his executive powers, strengthening the role of the Parliament and the prime minister, turning Croatia into a parliamentary republic. The prime minister again (as before 1990) became the foremost post in Croatian politics.

 there have been twelve Prime Ministers who have chaired 14 governments since the first multi-party elections. Nine prime ministers were members of the Croatian Democratic Union during their terms of office, two were members of the Social Democratic Party and one was not a member of any political party. Since independence there has been one female prime minister (Jadranka Kosor).

List of prime ministers

Croatia formally declared itself independent on 25 June 1991. After the declaration of independence, the position continued to be named the Prime Minister of the Republic of Croatia.

 Notes

1. From 1990 until the constitutional changes enacted in 2000, which replaced a powerful semi-presidential system (de facto a superpresidential system) with an incomplete parliamentary system, the term of the Prime Minister legally began on the date on which he was appointed by the President of the Republic and not on the date when he received a vote of confidence in Parliament, as is the case since 2000.
2. Until 12 October 2010.

Spouses of prime ministers

See also 
List of cabinets of Croatia
List of Croatian prime ministers by time in office
President of Croatia
List of presidents of Croatia
Speaker of the Croatian Parliament
Secretary of the League of Communists of Croatia
Politics of Croatia
List of heads of state of Yugoslavia
Prime Minister of Yugoslavia
 2020 St. Mark's Square attack

References

 
Croatia, List of Prime Ministers of
Lists of political office-holders in Croatia
1990 establishments in Croatia